Govindammal Aditanar College for Women is a college situated in Tiruchendur, Thoothukudi district, Tamil Nadu, India. It is affiliated with Manonmaniam Sundaranar University. It teaches arts and science degrees for both undergraduate and postgraduate degrees, as well as certification courses and a research Ph.D. in Mathematics. The college was founded by Sivanthi Adithan in 1987 and is fully financed by the Aditanar Educational Trust, with no financial aid from the government.

See also
Education in India
Literacy in India
List of educational institutions in Thoothukudi district
List of institutions of higher education in Tamil Nadu

References

External links
 

Women's universities and colleges in Tamil Nadu
Thoothukudi district
Educational institutions established in 1987
1987 establishments in Tamil Nadu
Colleges affiliated to Manonmaniam Sundaranar University
Universities and colleges in Thoothukudi district